Murun-e Pas Bagh (also Romanized as Mūrūn-e Pas Bāgh; also known as Mūrān and Mūrūn) is a village in Sar Asiab-e Yusefi Rural District, Bahmai-ye Garmsiri District, Bahmai County, Kohgiluyeh and Boyer-Ahmad Province, Iran. At the 2006 census, its population was 150, in 34 families.

References 

Populated places in Bahmai County